Intense Tropical Cyclone Batsirai was a deadly tropical cyclone which heavily impacted Madagascar in February 2022, becoming the strongest tropical cyclone to strike Madagascar since Cyclone Enawo in 2017. It made landfall two weeks after Tropical Storm Ana brought deadly floods to the island country in late January. The second tropical disturbance, the first tropical cyclone, and the first intense tropical cyclone of the 2021–22 South-West Indian Ocean cyclone season, Batsirai originated from a tropical disturbance that was first noted on 24 January 2022. It fluctuated in intensity and became a moderate tropical storm on 27 January 2022, after which it unexpectedly rapidly intensified into an intense tropical cyclone. It then weakened and struggled to intensify through the coming days due to present wind shear and dry air, where it weakened after some time. Afterward, it entered much more favorable conditions, rapidly intensified yet again to a high-end Category 4 cyclone on the Saffir–Simpson scale while moving towards Madagascar. The storm underwent an eyewall replacement cycle the next day, and fluctuated in intensity before making landfall in Madagascar as a Category 3 cyclone, later rapidly weakening due to the mountainous terrain on the island.

Mauritius and Réunion both experienced damage from the storm, though the effects were relatively minor. 123 deaths—121 in Madagascar and 2 in Mauritius—were reported due to Batsirai. As the storm approached, Madagascar prepared recovery supplies, with worries of significant flooding due to the more barren geography of the country. The United Nations supported preparation and relief efforts for after the storm as well, since millions were expected to be affected by it. Batsirai made landfall in the country early on 5 February, and brought heavy impacts and majorly disrupting power and communication throughout the affected areas. Entire towns were devastated, with thousands of structures being damaged or destroyed. After the storm passed, thousands of people evacuated to temporary shelters. Batsirai left at least 112,000 displaced, and 124,000 homes affected. Overall, Cyclone Batsirai caused a total of $190 million in damages throughout the storm's life. The same areas were affected a near year later by a more powerful Cyclone Freddy.

Meteorological history

The disturbance was also located within a marginally favourable environment for further development, with high levels of vertical wind shear, being offset by warm sea surface temperatures of around 29–30 °C (84–86 °F). The Joint Typhoon Warning Center (JTWC) gave a low chance for potential tropical cyclogenesis within the next 24 hours. A day later at 00:30 UTC, the agency upgraded the probability to medium after the system gradually improved its convective pattern. Later at 21:30 UTC the same day, the agency issued a Tropical Cyclone Formation Alert (TCFA) for Invest 96S, after noting its obscure low-level circulation center. Meanwhile, at midday of 25 January, the Météo-France La Réunion (MFR) recognized the same low pressure system and later upgraded it to tropical disturbance status at 06:00 UTC the next day. According to them, the system's convection had shown signs of gradual organization since 24 January. The center had become better defined with low-level clouds converging towards it in a defined circular pattern, suggesting that a closed circulation had formed. The MFR further upgraded it to a tropical depression at 12:00 UTC the same day, as it continued to improve its convective structure along its low-level center. After its convective activity was briefly interrupted after 18:00 UTC due to dry air, The JTWC subsequently initiated advisories on the system and classified it as Tropical Cyclone 08S at 03:00 UTC the next day.

Three hours later, the MFR reported that the system had become a moderate tropical storm, and the Mauritius Meteorological Services named it Batsirai. Between 06:00 UTC and 12:00 UTC, Batsirai underwent rapid deepening and intensified from a moderate tropical storm to an intense tropical cyclone within a span of three hours. According to the MFR, it was favoured by the very small size of the system and its fast movement. It had also established an inner core  in diameter.
However, by 18:00 UTC, it started to rapidly decline after its eye quickly collapsed and the cloud tops had warmed. Because of these reasons, the MFR downgraded it to a tropical cyclone. At midnight of 28 January, it was further downgraded to a moderate tropical storm, after further weakening of the convective structure. Three hours later, the JTWC downgraded it back to a tropical storm status.

Batsirai resumed its intensification after being upgraded to a severe tropical storm at 06:00 UTC the next day. Nine hours later, the JTWC upgraded it to a Category 1 tropical cyclone. At 03:00 UTC on 30 January, the JTWC further upgraded it to a Category 2 tropical cyclone after noting a well-defined central dense overcast and a microwave eye feature. The MFR further upgraded it to tropical cyclone status at midday. However, this was short-lived, and it weakened to Category 1 status by 03:00 UTC on 1 February, as its pinhole-shaped eye collapsed and its eyewall became disorganized, possibly due to the influence of increasing vertical wind shear. At 15:00 UTC the same day, however, it re - strengthened to Category 2 status, as it managed to consolidate and its eye feature re-appeared on satellite imagery. Three hours later, the MFR upgraded it to an intense tropical cyclone.

By 03:00 UTC on 2 February, the cyclone underwent another round of rapid intensification, intensifying from a Category 2 to a Category 4 tropical cyclone. After reaching its peak at 12:00 UTC, satellite imagery depicted the formation of another eyewall and signs of weakening. It weakened to a Category 3 system during this time. After completing the eyewall replacement cycle, the storm again briefly intensified into a Category 4 system, with MFR determining that Batsirai's central barometric pressure had rapidly fallen to 934 hPa (mbar; 27.58 inHg). It weakened again to a Category 3 system, though it still maintained its overall convective structure.

Gradually weakening due to land interaction with Madagascar, it made landfall at 17:30 UTC on 5 February close to the city of Nosy Varika. MFR declared that Batsirai had degenerated into an overland depression, with the JTWC downgrading it to a tropical storm. The system entered into the Mozambique Channel, and the MFR re-upgraded the system to a moderate tropical storm. By 7 February, it weakened into a remnant low before transitioning into a post-tropical cyclone. Despite fluctuating convective activity, high wind shear, and low sea surface temperatures, due to baroclinic forces, the MFR upgraded the system to a moderate tropical storm once more. It then underwent subtropical transition according to the JTWC, with the agency ceasing advisories on the system on 15:00 UTC of 8 February. MFR issued their last advisory on the storm on 8 February as it again transitioned into a post-tropical cyclone, with the system being last noted on 11 February.

Preparations

Mauritius
A class IV cyclone warning was issued on 2 February as Batsirai neared the island.

Madagascar 
The country's capital, Antananarivo, was predicted to have  of rainfall. Search and Rescue teams were deployed in Brickaville, Manakara, and Morondava. The START Network set aside $567,000 to provide assistance. Emergency stock lists were updated by HCT members to help restock humanitarian items. The country's government's disaster management agency worked with UNOSAT as well, and aerial assistance was also prepared as Batsirai approached. Extensive flooding in the east, southeast, and central highlands and major damage were anticipated. The storm was also expected to cause more damage than usual due to the deforestation the country experienced in the last 20 years.

Batsirai was expected to worsen food scarcities and emergencies in the country. Schools were closed on 4 February, and residents in low-lying and coastal areas were advised to leave. The storm was also feared to hamper the relief effects of Tropical Storm Ana weeks before. A predicted 4.4 million people were expected to be affected by the storm across 14 districts, with 595,000 directly. More than 150,000 inhabitants were expected be displaced. The IFRC launched a fundraiser to help with potential victims of the storm.

Waves of up to 15 m (50 ft) were forecasted as the storm closed in on the coast. The United Nations worked with aid agencies to help with preparedness and the aftermath. Humanitarian items were stockpiled, and rescue aircraft were put on standby. A spokesman for the UN's organization OCHA, stated the impact of Batsirai was expected to be "considerable".

Impact

Mauritius
Along with the airport, all transport services were closed due to the impact. Wind gusts reached , and rain totalled  in other areas of the island country. Two deaths were reported. Trees had been uprooted in many areas, and at least 7,500 homes faced power outages. A total of 138 people sought refuge in evacuation centers. The Mahébourg waterfront was damaged by large waves, with several chairs and tables swept into the sea.

Réunion
At least 36,000 people on the island lost power as Batsirai approached, with 10,000 still out on 7 February. Several people were injured, with the storm causing carbon monoxide poisoning in 10 people. Eleven sailors were stranded in an oil tanker during the storm, and were rescued on 4 February. Agricultural losses were estimated at €47 million ($53.3 million).

Madagascar 
Communication was sparse initially when the storm made landfall. Batsirai's conditions caused power outages and forced many people to move into shelters. Trees fell and power grids were knocked out, as well as homes were destroyed. At least 112,000 people were displaced by the storm, with 91,000 left homeless. Several houses had their roofs completely blown away, and many large coconut palm trees were blown over. Some houses were reduced to just wooden frames, and a survivor said the damage resembled a "fire", and that it was the "strongest cyclone [anyone] had experienced". Mananjary and Manakara were particularly heavy hit, with the former having at least 26,000 displaced alone, and had its hospital and prison damaged as well. A large portion of Madagascar was still waterlogged from Ana weeks earlier, and the arrival of Batsirai worsened the effects.

Nosy Varika was strongly damaged. An official described the damage as if they were "bombed", with 95% of buildings being reported as destroyed. Floods cut access to the town. Electric poles fell, and roofs were torn off in the city of Fianarantsoa, which was also heavily flooded. A landslide was caused by the cyclone in the region of Haute Matsiatra. Flooding and debris rendered 17 bridges and 17 roads impassable, as well as at least 69 classrooms completely destroyed, and 439 damaged; this left over 9,000 children unable to attend lessons, with 403 in Mananjary alone. After the storm passed, already flooded canals and rivers continued to rise. In Mananjary and surrounding areas, early reports indicated over 6,000 buildings were flooded, with half of them destroyed. The president of Madagascar, Andry Rajoelina, showed images of a church's metal roof twisted off, along other damage online after he visited Mananjary. Fruit trees and rice paddies were ripped and flooded in the town and other areas, hampering the harvest that was only two weeks away. The time it took to travel to the town by car was increased several days due to damage. Main roads linking the capital to smaller areas were cut off, making relief efforts even harder.

The UNHAS aerial flight discovered that Fitovinany region mostly suffered flooding damage; with several communities taking heavy hits to their agriculture and infrastructure. In total, over 17,100 homes were damaged, with 7,488 destroyed, 2,714 partially, and 6,978 flooded. 53 health centers were damaged, along with 6 destroyed. In Ikongo alone, 87 people died. Collapsing homes killed people in their sleep. A member of parliament representing the district also said that people also drowned in flooded areas there as well.

121 deaths were reported, including 13 children, with 5 being under 12 years of age.

Aftermath

Mauritius 
A total of 454 people, in 182 affected families, sought shelter in 45 centers. They were all surveyed in order to give them the necessary help after the storm. The Minister of Social Integration, Social Security, and National Solidarity, Mrs. Fazila Jeewa-Daureeawoo, made the announcement about the procedure on 7 February.

Madagascar 

The impacts of Tropical Storm Ana were compounded by the damage that Batsirai brought.

Schools and churches prepared to shelter those displaced around Mananjary. World Food Programme distributed hot meals to 4,000 evacuated and displaced people in shelters. Drinking water and basic necessities were lacking in impacted areas, and the spreading of several diseases was also a concern. A humanitarian crisis was also feared to rise out of the storm's effects. Aerial rescue effort first took place on 6 February via an UNHAS flight. The Malagasy government provided households affected with monetary donations. UNICEF also supported relief efforts by giving out kits to create child-friendly spaces in several regions of the country. Other measures were taken to help decrease incidents inside of shelters as well. A team that initially consisted of five EU Civil Protection officials from France, Finland, and Sweden traveled to affected areas to help victims of the storm.

The PRIOI had deployed 87 tons of humanitarian material from its warehouses in the country to use for relief efforts, an effort that cost approximately €667,000. An estimated 75,000 people—including 37,500 children—were in need of relief assistance after Batsirai. WASH partners delivered items to Vatovavy, Fitovinany, and Atsimo Atisinanana regions.

International response 
France and Germany have offered water purification modules via the EU Civil Protection Mechanism.

See also

 Tropical cyclones in 2022
 Weather of 2022
 List of South-West Indian Ocean intense tropical cyclones
 Tropical cyclones in the Mascarene Islands
 Cyclone Honorinina (1986) – cyclone that struck eastern Madagascar in March 1986.
 Cyclone Geralda (1994) – a powerful tropical cyclone that caused catastrophic damage in Madagascar
 Cyclone Giovanna (2012) – cyclone that had a similar path and intensity and occurred exactly ten years prior
 Cyclone Emnati (2022)  – Powerful storm which struck the same areas three weeks later
 Cyclone Freddy (2023) – A powerful and long lived cyclone which also affected the same areas a year later
 Climate change in Madagascar

Notes

References

External links

MFR Track Data of Intense Tropical Cyclone Batsirai 
JTWC Best Track Data of Tropical Cyclone 08S (Batsirai)
08S.BATSIRAI from the United States Naval Research Laboratory

2021–22 South-West Indian Ocean cyclone season
2022 disasters in Africa
2022 in Madagascar
2022 meteorology
2020s in Mauritius
2020s in Réunion
Cyclones in Madagascar
Cyclones in Mauritius
Cyclones in Réunion
February 2022 events in Africa
Intense Tropical Cyclones
January 2022 events in Africa
Tropical cyclones in 2022
Tropical cyclones in the Mascarene Islands
Climate change in Madagascar
Natural disasters in Madagascar